Headtrip or variants may refer to:

Headtrip (comics), character from True Believers (comics)
 Headtrip (album), Slapshock 2001
"Headtrip", song by Sevendust from  Home (Sevendust album)
 "Headtrip", from the Copperpot album Chapter 7 (2005) Verb T
Headtrip (band), original name of German rock band 4Lyn

See also
Headtrip to Nowhere Flybanger 2001
Lt Headtrip, hip hop artist living in Queens, NY